The Kalayaan Flyover, also known as the EDSA–Kalayaan Flyover, is a four-lane flyover connecting Gil Puyat Avenue, Epifanio de los Santos Avenue (EDSA), Kalayaan Avenue, and 32nd Street in Metro Manila, the Philippines. Located primarily in Makati with a short portion in Taguig, it facilitates access from the Makati Central Business District to the Bonifacio Global City and, ultimately, to Circumferential Road 5 (C-5).

Preparation work for the flyover began in 1997, when the Bases Conversion and Development Authority (BCDA) announced the construction of two new primary access points to the Bonifacio Global City, with the flyover serving as the main western access point to the area.  Designed by Katahira & Engineers Asia, actual construction of the flyover began in late 1997 with the construction of the segment between Gil Puyat Avenue and EDSA, contracted to the Uy-Pajara Construction Company.   Work on the segment between Kalayaan Avenue and the Bonifacio Global City meanwhile began in April 1999, with the work being contracted to F.F. Cruz and Co., one of the Philippines' largest construction companies.  Capable of holding up to 4,000 vehicles at one time, the flyover would reduce travel times between Makati and the Bonifacio Global City to five minutes by providing a direct connection between the two business districts instead of needing to route vehicles through EDSA.

The  flyover was inaugurated by President Joseph Estrada and other government officials on January 25, 2000.  Although promoted as a public project, it has been rumored that the ₱950 million spent for the flyover's construction did not come from public funds, but rather was underwritten by the First Pacific group through their local subsidiary, Metro Pacific.

References

Road interchanges in the Philippines